Adolff is a German surname. Notable people with the surname include:

Heinz Paul Adolff (1914–1943), German Major of Reserves,  Paratrooper officer during World War II
Kurt Adolff (1921–2012), German racing driver

See also
Adolf

German-language surnames